Adalbert Covacs (born 19 June 1947) is a Romanian modern pentathlete who competed at the 1972 Summer Olympics. He is also known as Adalbert Covaci or Albert Covaci.

References

1947 births
Living people
Romanian male modern pentathletes
Olympic modern pentathletes of Romania
Modern pentathletes at the 1972 Summer Olympics
Sportspeople from Târgu Mureș